Esther Duflo, FBA (born 25 October 1972) is a French–American economist who is a professor of Poverty Alleviation and Development Economics at the Massachusetts Institute of Technology (MIT). She is the co-founder and co-director of the Abdul Latif Jameel Poverty Action Lab (J-PAL), which was established in 2003. She shared the 2019 Nobel Memorial Prize in Economic Sciences with Abhijit Banerjee and Michael Kremer, "for their experimental approach to alleviating global poverty".

Duflo is a National Bureau of Economic Research (NBER) research associate, a board member of the Bureau for Research and Economic Analysis of Development (BREAD), and director of the Centre for Economic Policy Research's development economics program. Her research focuses on microeconomic issues in developing countries, including household behavior, education, access to finance, health, and policy evaluation. Together with Abhijit Banerjee, Dean Karlan, Michael Kremer, John A. List, and Sendhil Mullainathan, she has been a driving force in advancing field experiments as an important methodology to discover causal relationships in economics. Together with Abhijit Banerjee, she wrote Poor Economics and Good Economics for Hard Times, published in April 2011 and November 2019, respectively. According to the Open Syllabus Project, Duflo is the seventh most frequently cited author on college syllabi for economics courses.

Early life and education
Duflo was born in 1972 in Paris, the daughter of pediatrician Violaine Duflo and mathematics professor Michel Duflo. During Duflo's childhood, her mother often participated in medical humanitarian projects.

After studying in the B/L program of Lycée Henri-IV's Classes préparatoires, Duflo began her undergraduate studies at École normale supérieure in Paris, planning to study history, her interest since childhood. In her second year, she began considering a career in the civil service or politics. She spent ten months in Moscow starting in 1993. She taught French and worked on a history thesis that described how the Soviet Union "had used the big construction sites, like the Stalingrad tractor factory, for propaganda, and how propaganda requirements changed the actual shape of the projects." In Moscow, she also worked as a research assistant for a French economist connected to the Central Bank of Russia and, separately, for Jeffrey Sachs, an American economist, who was advising the Russian Minister of Finance. The experiences at these research posts led her to conclude that "economics had potential as a lever of action in the world" and she could satisfy academic ambitions while doing "things that mattered".

She finished her degree in history and economics at École Normale Supérieure in 1994 and received a master's degree from DELTA, now the Paris School of Economics, jointly with the School for Advanced Studies in the Social Sciences (EHESS) of the Université Paris Sciences et Lettres (PSL) and the École Normale Supérieure, in 1995. Subsequently, she obtained a PhD degree in economics at MIT in 1999, under the joint supervision of Abhijit Banerjee and Joshua Angrist. Her doctoral dissertation focused on effects of a natural experiment involving an Indonesian school-expansion program, in the 1970s, and it provided conclusive evidence that in a developing country, more education resulted in higher wages. Upon completing her doctorate, she was appointed assistant professor of economics at MIT and has been at MIT ever since, aside from a leave at Princeton University in 2001–2002, and at the Paris School of Economics in 2007 and 2017.

Career
After earning her PhD in 1999, Duflo became an assistant professor at MIT. She was promoted to associate professor (with tenure) in 2002, at 29, making her among the youngest faculty members to be awarded tenure, and to full professor in 2003.

Duflo and Abhijit Banerjee have taken a special interest in India since 1997. In 2003, she conducted a trial experiment on teacher absenteeism in 120 schools run by a non-profit group. By encouraging the teachers to photograph themselves with their students each day, she was able to reduce their absenteeism.

In 2003, she co-founded Poverty Action Lab at MIT, which has since conducted over 200 empirical development experiments and trained development practitioners to run randomized controlled trials. The lab has branches in Chennai, India and at the Paris School of Economics. In 2004, together with several colleagues, Duflo conducted another experiment in India. It showed that taped speeches by women were more readily accepted in villages that had experienced women leaders. Duflo became increasingly convinced that communities supporting women candidates could expect economic benefits, but she experienced difficulty in convincing her peers. Focused on assessing developments addressing social welfare, in 2008, she received the Frontier of Knowledge award for development cooperation. Duflo entered the public sphere in 2013, when she sat on the new Global Development Committee, which advised former US President Barack Obama on issues regarding development aid in poor countries.

Duflo is an NBER research associate, a board member of the Bureau for Research and Economic Analysis of Development (BREAD), and director of the Centre for Economic Policy Research's development economics program, where she serves as both a board member and a director.

She was the founding editor of the American Economic Journal: Applied Economics, editor of The American Economic Review, and a co-editor of The Review of Economics and Statistics and the Journal of Development Economics. Also, she is a member of the editorial committee of the Annual Review of Economics and a member of the Human Capital Research Programme within the International Growth Centre.

She writes a monthly column for Libération, a French daily newspaper.

She was the main speaker at the first Bocconi Lecture of Bocconi University in 2010, followed in 2011 by Caroline Hoxby.

In 2020, it was announced that Duflo would become chair of the Fund for Innovation in Development, an organization hosted by the French Development Agency that provides grants to develop and scale interventions for poverty and inequality.

Personal life
Duflo is married to MIT professor Abhijit Banerjee; the couple have two children. Banerjee was a joint supervisor of Duflo's PhD in economics at MIT in 1999.

Selected works

Books
In April 2011, Duflo released her book Poor Economics, co-authored with Banerjee. It documents their 15 years of experience in conducting randomized control trials to alleviate poverty. The book has received critical acclaim. Nobel laureate Amartya Sen called it "a marvelously insightful book by the two outstanding researchers on the real nature of poverty."

Papers
Duflo has published numerous papers, receiving 6,200 citations in 2017. Most of them have appeared in the top five economic journals.

Awards

Nobel prize in Economic Sciences
Esther Duflo was awarded the Sveriges Riksbank Prize in Economic Sciences in Memory of Alfred Nobel in 2019 along with her two co-researchers Abhijit Banerjee and Michael Kremer "for their experimental approach to alleviating global poverty". Duflo is the youngest person (at age 46) and the second woman to win this award (after Elinor Ostrom in 2009).

The press release from the Royal Swedish Academy of Sciences noted: "Their experimental research methods now entirely dominate development economics." The Nobel committee commented:

Responding by telephone to the Royal Swedish Academy of Sciences, Duflo explained that she received the prize "at an extremely opportune and important time" and hoped that it would "inspire many, many other women to continue working and many other men to give them the respect that they deserve, like every single human being." She also revealed that she wanted to use the award as a "megaphone" in her fighting efforts to tackle poverty and to improve children's education.

French President Emmanuel Macron offered his congratulations: "Esther Duflo's magnificent Nobel Prize is a reminder that French economists are currently among the best in the world and shows that research in that field can have concrete impact on human welfare."

Much of the discussion related to the prize shared by Duflo and her co-laureates focused on their influential use of randomized controlled trials in designing their experiments. Summarizing the research approach which she had utilized along with Banerjee and Kremer, Duflo said simply, "Our goal is to make sure that the fight against poverty is based on scientific evidence."

Other awards
 Duflo was awarded the Elaine Bennett Research Prize by the American Economic Association in 2002, which honours a female economist under 40 who has made outstanding contributions in any field of economic research.
 In 2005, the think tank Cercle des économistes awarded her the Best Young French Economist prize.
 In 2008, The Economist listed Duflo as one of the top eight young economists in the world.
 In May 2008, the American magazine Foreign Policy named her as one of the top 100 public intellectuals in the world.
 In 2009, she was named a MacArthur Foundation Fellow, otherwise known as a "genius" grant. She is also a fellow of the American Academy of Arts and Sciences since 2009. On 21 May 2009, she was selected as the first recipient of the Calvó-Armengol International Prize, which she finally received on 4 June 2010. The prize is awarded every two years to a top young researcher in economics or the social sciences for contributions to the theory and comprehension of the mechanisms of social interaction.
 She is a recipient of the 2010 John Bates Clark Medal for economists under 40 who have made the most significant contribution to economic thought and knowledge. In the autumn of 2010, she was named to Fortune magazine's 40 Under 40 list. She received her (first) honorary doctorate from the Université catholique de Louvain, on 2 February 2010.
 In 2010, Foreign Policy again named her to its list of top 100 global thinkers.
 She was named one of Time magazine's 100 most influential people in the world in April 2011.
 In 2012, Duflo was picked by Foreign Policy magazine as one of its Top 100 Global Thinkers.
 She shared the 2012 Gerald Loeb Award Honorable Mention for Business Book for Poor Economics with co-author Abhijit Banerjee.
In 2013, Duflo was awarded the Dan David Prize for her contribution to the advancement of "Preventive Medicine"
 In November 2013, she was honoured as an Officer of the French Order of Merit.
 She received the John von Neumann Award by Rajk László College for Advanced Studies in December 2013.
 In 2014, she won the Infosys Prize in Social Science-Economics for leading "a major shift in development economics".
 She received the 2015 Princess of Asturias Social Sciences award in Spain.
 In 2015, she received the A.SK Social Sciences Award from the WZB Berlin Social Science Center, one of the world's largest awards in the social sciences, which is endowed with US$200,000.
 On 8 November 2019, she received an honorary doctorate from Erasmus University Rotterdam.
 In 2022, Esther Duflo and Abhijit Banerjee received the Golden Plate Award of the American Academy of Achievement.

Honours
 Commandeur of the Legion of Honour (France).
 Officier of the National Order of Merit (France).

References

External links

 Esther Duflo's Home Page at MIT, including her CV with comprehensive list of awards and publications
 Poverty Action Lab
 2011 Interview of Esther Duflo at Philanthropy Action
 Profile and Papers at Research Papers in Economics/RePEc
  
 Publications at the National Bureau of Economic Research
  including the Prize Lecture 8 December 2019 Field experiments and the practice of policy

1972 births
Living people
French women economists
American women economists
Lycée Henri-IV alumni
École Normale Supérieure alumni
French development economists
Massachusetts Institute of Technology alumni
MIT School of Humanities, Arts, and Social Sciences faculty
MacArthur Fellows
Fellows of the Econometric Society
Fellows of the British Academy
21st-century American economists
Education economists
Fellows of the American Academy of Arts and Sciences
Economics journal editors
Writers from Paris
Gerald Loeb Award winners for Business Books
American Nobel laureates
Women Nobel laureates
French Nobel laureates
Nobel laureates in Economics
Officers of the Ordre national du Mérite
French emigrants to the United States
Fellows of the American Academy of Political and Social Science
21st-century American women
American Economic Review editors
Corresponding Fellows of the British Academy